Ride is a Canadian drama television series created by Jill Girling and Lori Mather-Welch that aired in Canada on YTV and in the United States on Nickelodeon. In Canada, the series premiered on September 5, 2016, and ended on October 6, 2016. In the United States, the series premiered on January 30, 2017, and ended on February 24, 2017. The series stars Kendra Leigh Timmins, Alana Boden, Oliver Dench, Jonny Gray, Natalie Lisinska, Manuel Pacific, Rameet Rauli, Mike Shara, and Sara Botsford.

Premise 
The series centers on Kit Bridges, an American teenager, who is a new classmate in the equestrian boarding school Covington Academy in England. She befriends a horse named TK.

Cast 
 Kendra Leigh Timmins as Kit Bridges
 Alana Boden as Elaine
 Oliver Dench as Will
 Jonny Gray as Josh
 Natalie Lisinska as Sally
 Manuel Pacific as Nav
 Rameet Rauli as Anya
 Mike Shara as Rudy Bridges
 Sara Botsford as Lady Covington

Production 
The series was produced by Breakthrough Entertainment in Canada in collaboration with Buccaneer Media in the United Kingdom. Ride was filmed in Toronto and in Northern Ireland. The series was greenlit for a season of 20 episodes. Nickelodeon picked up the series for broadcast in the United States.

Broadcast and release 
On August 11, 2016, a full episode was released exclusively on YTV's online platforms ahead of the series premiere. The series premiered on YTV in Canada on September 5, 2016. New episodes aired in Canada for the rest of that week. The series premiered on Nickelodeon in the United States on January 30, 2017.

U.S. ratings 
 
}}

Episodes

References

External links 
 
 Ride at YTV

2010s Canadian teen drama television series
2016 Canadian television series debuts
2016 Canadian television series endings
English-language television shows
Nickelodeon original programming
YTV (Canadian TV channel) original programming